The Kanevskaya constituency (No.53) is a Russian legislative constituency in Krasnodar Krai. The constituency covers predominantly rural northern Krasnodar Krai.

Members elected

Election results

1993

|-
! colspan=2 style="background-color:#E9E9E9;text-align:left;vertical-align:top;" |Candidate
! style="background-color:#E9E9E9;text-align:left;vertical-align:top;" |Party
! style="background-color:#E9E9E9;text-align:right;" |Votes
! style="background-color:#E9E9E9;text-align:right;" |%
|-
|style="background-color:"|
|align=left|Anatoly Kochegura
|align=left|Independent
|
|40.23%
|-
| colspan="5" style="background-color:#E9E9E9;"|
|- style="font-weight:bold"
| colspan="3" style="text-align:left;" | Total
| 
| 100%
|-
| colspan="5" style="background-color:#E9E9E9;"|
|- style="font-weight:bold"
| colspan="4" |Source:
|
|}

1995

|-
! colspan=2 style="background-color:#E9E9E9;text-align:left;vertical-align:top;" |Candidate
! style="background-color:#E9E9E9;text-align:left;vertical-align:top;" |Party
! style="background-color:#E9E9E9;text-align:right;" |Votes
! style="background-color:#E9E9E9;text-align:right;" |%
|-
|style="background-color:"|
|align=left|Aleksandr Petrik
|align=left|Communist Party
|
|27.99%
|-
|style="background-color:"|
|align=left|Vladimir Lisichkin
|align=left|Liberal Democratic Party
|
|14.44%
|-
|style="background-color:"|
|align=left|Valentin Tishchenko
|align=left|Independent
|
|8.62%
|-
|style="background-color:"|
|align=left|Galina Kuznetsova
|align=left|Independent
|
|8.37%
|-
|style="background-color:"|
|align=left|Anatoly Kochegura (incumbent)
|align=left|Independent
|
|7.83%
|-
|style="background-color:"|
|align=left|Aleksey Melnik
|align=left|Our Home – Russia
|
|5.83%
|-
|style="background-color:"|
|align=left|Anatoly Soldatov
|align=left|Independent
|
|5.07%
|-
|style="background-color:"|
|align=left|Anatoly Borzilov
|align=left|Agrarian Party
|
|4.85%
|-
|style="background-color:#3A46CE"|
|align=left|Vladimir Istomin
|align=left|Democratic Choice of Russia – United Democrats
|
|4.08%
|-
|style="background-color:"|
|align=left|Vladimir Maystrenko
|align=left|Independent
|
|3.67%
|-
|style="background-color:"|
|align=left|Aleksandr But
|align=left|Independent
|
|2.24%
|-
|style="background-color:#000000"|
|colspan=2 |against all
|
|5.52%
|-
| colspan="5" style="background-color:#E9E9E9;"|
|- style="font-weight:bold"
| colspan="3" style="text-align:left;" | Total
| 
| 100%
|-
| colspan="5" style="background-color:#E9E9E9;"|
|- style="font-weight:bold"
| colspan="4" |Source:
|
|}

1998

|-
! colspan=2 style="background-color:#E9E9E9;text-align:left;vertical-align:top;" |Candidate
! style="background-color:#E9E9E9;text-align:left;vertical-align:top;" |Party
! style="background-color:#E9E9E9;text-align:right;" |Votes
! style="background-color:#E9E9E9;text-align:right;" |%
|-
|style="background-color:"|
|align=left|Aleksandr Burulko
|align=left|Communist Party
|-
|34.17%
|-
| colspan="5" style="background-color:#E9E9E9;"|
|- style="font-weight:bold"
| colspan="3" style="text-align:left;" | Total
| -
| 100%
|-
| colspan="5" style="background-color:#E9E9E9;"|
|- style="font-weight:bold"
| colspan="4" |Source:
|
|}

1999

|-
! colspan=2 style="background-color:#E9E9E9;text-align:left;vertical-align:top;" |Candidate
! style="background-color:#E9E9E9;text-align:left;vertical-align:top;" |Party
! style="background-color:#E9E9E9;text-align:right;" |Votes
! style="background-color:#E9E9E9;text-align:right;" |%
|-
|style="background-color:"|
|align=left|Aleksandr Burulko (incumbent)
|align=left|Communist Party
|
|43.18%
|-
|style="background-color:"|
|align=left|Aleksandr Korolev
|align=left|Independent
|
|17.45%
|-
|style="background-color:"|
|align=left|Viktoria Ziborova
|align=left|Independent
|
|8.74%
|-
|style="background-color:"|
|align=left|Albina Zhuravleva
|align=left|Yabloko
|
|8.04%
|-
|style="background-color:#1042A5"|
|align=left|Viktor Boyko
|align=left|Union of Right Forces
|
|7.83%
|-
|style="background-color:#FF4400"|
|align=left|Anatoly Gorobets
|align=left|Andrey Nikolayev and Svyatoslav Fyodorov Bloc
|
|4.02%
|-
|style="background-color:#F1043D"|
|align=left|Igor Vinogradov
|align=left|Socialist Party
|
|1.07%
|-
|style="background-color:#020266"|
|align=left|Vladimir Murakhovsky
|align=left|Russian Socialist Party
|
|1.04%
|-
|style="background-color:#000000"|
|colspan=2 |against all
|
|7.35%
|-
| colspan="5" style="background-color:#E9E9E9;"|
|- style="font-weight:bold"
| colspan="3" style="text-align:left;" | Total
| 
| 100%
|-
| colspan="5" style="background-color:#E9E9E9;"|
|- style="font-weight:bold"
| colspan="4" |Source:
|
|}

2003

|-
! colspan=2 style="background-color:#E9E9E9;text-align:left;vertical-align:top;" |Candidate
! style="background-color:#E9E9E9;text-align:left;vertical-align:top;" |Party
! style="background-color:#E9E9E9;text-align:right;" |Votes
! style="background-color:#E9E9E9;text-align:right;" |%
|-
|style="background-color:"|
|align=left|Galina Doroshenko
|align=left|Independent
|
|56.47%
|-
|style="background-color: " |
|align=left|Aleksandr Burulko (incumbent)
|align=left|Communist Party
|
|22.20%
|-
|style="background-color: " |
|align=left|Svetlana Kretova
|align=left|Yabloko
|
|5.26%
|-
|style="background-color:"|
|align=left|Lyubov Ospishcheva
|align=left|Independent
|
|2.16%
|-
|style="background-color:#000000"|
|colspan=2 |against all
|
|12.40%
|-
| colspan="5" style="background-color:#E9E9E9;"|
|- style="font-weight:bold"
| colspan="3" style="text-align:left;" | Total
| 
| 100%
|-
| colspan="5" style="background-color:#E9E9E9;"|
|- style="font-weight:bold"
| colspan="4" |Source:
|
|}

2016

|-
! colspan=2 style="background-color:#E9E9E9;text-align:left;vertical-align:top;" |Candidate
! style="background-color:#E9E9E9;text-align:left;vertical-align:top;" |Party
! style="background-color:#E9E9E9;text-align:right;" |Votes
! style="background-color:#E9E9E9;text-align:right;" |%
|-
|style="background-color: " |
|align=left|Natalya Boyeva
|align=left|United Russia
|
|58.47%
|-
|style="background-color:"|
|align=left|Pavel Sokolenko
|align=left|Communist Party
|
|9.92%
|-
|style="background-color:"|
|align=left|Stanislav Vasilevsky
|align=left|Liberal Democratic Party
|
|6.46%
|-
|style="background-color:"|
|align=left|Andrey Rudenko
|align=left|A Just Russia
|
|6.25%
|-
|style="background:"| 
|align=left|Aleksandr Turenko
|align=left|Communists of Russia
|
|3.81%
|-
|style="background-color:"|
|align=left|Aleksandr Baturinets
|align=left|Yabloko
|
|3.80%
|-
|style="background-color:"|
|align=left|Vladimir Zverev
|align=left|Rodina
|
|3.23%
|-
|style="background-color:"|
|align=left|Andrey Tumin
|align=left|Patriots of Russia
|
|1.91%
|-
|style="background-color:"|
|align=left|Oleg Kerimov
|align=left|Party of Growth
|
|1.24%
|-
| colspan="5" style="background-color:#E9E9E9;"|
|- style="font-weight:bold"
| colspan="3" style="text-align:left;" | Total
| 
| 100%
|-
| colspan="5" style="background-color:#E9E9E9;"|
|- style="font-weight:bold"
| colspan="4" |Source:
|
|}

2021

|-
! colspan=2 style="background-color:#E9E9E9;text-align:left;vertical-align:top;" |Candidate
! style="background-color:#E9E9E9;text-align:left;vertical-align:top;" |Party
! style="background-color:#E9E9E9;text-align:right;" |Votes
! style="background-color:#E9E9E9;text-align:right;" |%
|-
|style="background-color: " |
|align=left|Dmitry Lotsmanov
|align=left|United Russia
|
|53.71%
|-
|style="background-color:"|
|align=left|Mikhail Akhmetgareyev
|align=left|Communist Party
|
|15.05%
|-
|style="background-color:"|
|align=left|Yulia Gazizova
|align=left|Liberal Democratic Party
|
|4.08%
|-
|style="background-color: "|
|align=left|Aleksandr Korovayny
|align=left|Yabloko
|
|3.97%
|-
|style="background-color: " |
|align=left|Eduard Vrublevsky
|align=left|New People
|
|3.93%
|-
|style="background-color:"|
|align=left|Aleksandr Tikhonov
|align=left|A Just Russia — For Truth
|
|3.76%
|-
|style="background-color: "|
|align=left|Aleksandr Yepishkin
|align=left|Russian Party of Freedom and Justice
|
|3.06%
|-
|style="background-color: "|
|align=left|Vladimir Karpekin
|align=left|Party of Pensioners
|
|2.90%
|-
|style="background-color:"|
|align=left|Lyudmila Volynskaya
|align=left|Rodina
|
|2.47%
|-
|style="background-color:"|
|align=left|Vitaly Klimenko
|align=left|Civic Platform
|
|1.90%
|-
|style="background-color: "|
|align=left|Andrey Stupak
|align=left|Party of Growth
|
|1.55%
|-
|style="background-color:"|
|align=left|Timur Tatyanchenko
|align=left|The Greens
|
|0.89%
|-
| colspan="5" style="background-color:#E9E9E9;"|
|- style="font-weight:bold"
| colspan="3" style="text-align:left;" | Total
| 
| 100%
|-
| colspan="5" style="background-color:#E9E9E9;"|
|- style="font-weight:bold"
| colspan="4" |Source:
|
|}

Notes

References

Russian legislative constituencies
Politics of Krasnodar Krai